Renata Pytelewska-Nielsen is a Polish-born former Danish long jumper.

She was born on 18. May 1966 in Otwock, Mazowieckie, Poland. 
She participated in the 1992 and 1996 Summer Olympics.
Her personal long jump record is 6.96 meter set in 1994.
In Denmark Pytelewska Nielsen was associated with the club Århus 1900 and she won most Danish golds in long jumps between 1990 and 2001.
In Denmark she also participated in 60 metres, 100 metres and triple jump.

In 1983 as Renata Pytelewska she met Lars Nielsen, a Danish pole vaulter. 
She moved to Denmark and in 1988 she gave birth to their twins.
She got Danish citizenship in 1992.

Since retiring from athletics she has been physical coach for the Denmark women's national football team, Dansk Sejlunion and the football team of AGF.

Competitions record

References 

1966 births
Athletes (track and field) at the 1992 Summer Olympics
Athletes (track and field) at the 1996 Summer Olympics
Danish female long jumpers
Danish female triple jumpers
Danish female sprinters
Living people
Naturalised citizens of Denmark
Olympic athletes of Denmark
Polish emigrants to Denmark
Polish female long jumpers
World Athletics Championships medalists
People from Otwock
Sportspeople from Masovian Voivodeship